AOCS may refer to:

 American Oil Chemists' Society
 American Open Currency Standard, a nonprofit organization opposed to fiat money and wishing to expedite the use of metal as money
 Attitude and Orbit Control Systems, systems used in the control of spacecraft.
 Aviation Officer Candidate School